Redemptive suffering is the Christian belief that human suffering, when accepted and offered up in union with the Passion of Jesus, can remit the just punishment for one's sins or for the sins of another, or for the other physical or spiritual needs of oneself or another. In Christianity, it is a tenet of Catholic theology, although it is taught in Reformed doctrine as well.

Pope John Paul II stated, "Each man, in his sufferings, can also become a sharer in the redemptive suffering of Christ". (cf. Colossians 1:24) Like an indulgence, redemptive suffering does not gain the individual forgiveness for their sin; forgiveness results from God's grace, freely given through Christ, which cannot be earned. (see Romans 4:3-5)

Forms
Religious practitioners in various traditions have found spiritual benefits from voluntarily bringing upon themselves additional pain and discomfort through corporal mortification. One extreme example of redemptive suffering, which existed in the 13th and 14th centuries in Europe, was the Flagellant movement. As a partial response to the Black Death, these radicals, who were later condemned as heretics in the Catholic Church, engaged in body mortification, usually by whipping themselves, to repent for their sins, which they believed led to the Black Death.(cf. 2 Samuel 24:10-15)

Roman Catholic Teaching

The Catechism of the Catholic Church states the following concerning redemptive suffering:Moved by so much suffering Christ not only allows himself to be touched by the sick, but he makes their miseries his own: "He took our infirmities and bore our diseases." But he did not heal all the sick. His healings were signs of the coming of the Kingdom of God. They announced a more radical healing: the victory over sin and death through his Passover. On the cross Christ took upon himself the whole weight of evil and took away the "sin of the world," of which illness is only a consequence. By his passion and death on the cross Christ has given a new meaning to suffering: it can henceforth configure us to him and unite us with his redemptive Passion.

Descriptions
Thérèse of Lisieux wrote the following about her own redemptive suffering from her deathbed:O Mother, it's very easy to write beautiful things about suffering, but writing is nothing, nothing! One must suffer in order to know! I really feel now that what I've said and written is true about everything ... It's true that I wanted to suffer much for God's sake, and it's true that I still desire this ... All I wrote about my desires for suffering. Oh! it's true just the same! And I am not sorry for delivering myself up to Love. Oh! no, I'm not sorry; on the contrary!
Likewise, Padre Pio said the following about the purification brought about through redemptive suffering:"I want your soul to be purified and tried by a daily hidden martyrdom. How many times," Jesus said to me a little while ago, "would you have abandoned me, my son, if I had not crucified you."

Reformed Christianity 
In Reformed theology, "redemptive suffering is that voluntarily undertaken in the cause of justice and the effort to combat disease."

See also
 Atonement
 Confraternity of penitents
 :fr:Dolorisme
 Instruments of penance 
 Mystici Corporis
 Roman Catholic theology
 Salvifici doloris
 Victim soul

References

Catholic penitential practices
Christian terminology
Suffering